The Hole is a 2001 British psychological thriller film directed by Nick Hamm, based on the 1993 novel After the Hole by Guy Burt. The film stars Thora Birch, Desmond Harrington, Daniel Brocklebank, Laurence Fox, Keira Knightley, and Embeth Davidtz. Filmed in 2000, the film featured Thora Birch in the lead role which was attributed to her appearance in American Beauty (1999). It also marked Knightley's first major role in a feature film.

The Hole was released in the United Kingdom on 20 April 2001 and grossed a total of $7.8 million. Dimension Films, which in October 2001 acquired the rights to distribute the film theatrically in the United States, never did so; it was instead released direct-to-video nearly two years later, by Dimension's then-fellow Disney subsidiary Buena Vista Distribution. The film was shot at Bray Studios and various locations around southern England, including Downside School in Somerset.

Plot
Private school student Liz resurfaces, disheveled and bloody, after disappearing 18 days prior along with her peers Mike, Geoff, and Frankie. Liz is interviewed by a psychiatrist, Dr. Phillipa Horwood. Liz recounts how her friend Martin arranged for the four to spend the weekend in an abandoned underground nuclear fallout shelter to avoid a school field trip. Liz portrays herself as being unpopular but as Frankie is her friend, she was able to convince the others to go down into the shelter.

When Martin fails to return for them, the four  realise they are trapped, and begin to turn on one another. They discover hidden microphones in the shelter which were placed there by Martin. Attempting to get Martin's attention, Frankie pretends to be ill, while Mike and Liz feign hatred for one another; Martin has had unrequited romantic feelings for her since their childhood. Liz claims they woke up one morning and found the hatch opened, allowing them all to finally escape.

Phillipa is skeptical of Liz's story. Martin is subsequently taken into police custody, where he tells an entirely different story: He claims Liz and Frankie orchestrated the scheme in order for Liz to get to know Mike better, and for Frankie to spend time with Geoff. Liz is not the unpopular loner she has portrayed herself as, in fact it is Martin who is the loner while Liz and Frankie are the popular girls. Meanwhile, Liz returns home, where she experiences disturbing flashbacks about what happened. An enraged Martin goes to visit Liz, believing she is framing him. She runs from him through the garden and approaches a weir. Martin cries, and Liz says that she knew they would let him go because they could not prove anything.

At their next meeting, Liz tells Phillipa that she cannot remember what happened in the shelter. Despite Phillipa's initial protestations, she agrees to Liz's request to go back to the bunker, hoping to invoke her memory. Once inside, Liz reveals the truth: she had locked herself and her friends inside in the hopes of winning Mike's affection, with whom she is obsessed. After discovering that both he and Geoff had slept with Frankie, she spontaneously decided to lock the door, isolating them and giving her the opportunity to become closer to Mike. The four had planned to drink and do drugs in the shelter, but the realisation that they are unable to escape throws the group into hysteria. Frankie soon becomes ill and is unable to stop vomiting. This increases her dehydration, tears the lining of her stomach, and puts a great strain on her heart (which is weakened by bulimia) leading to cardiac arrest and death.

Liz, Mike, and Geoff gradually run out of food and water. When Mike discovers that Geoff is hoarding a Coca-Cola in his backpack, he attacks him in a fit of rage and incidentally kills him by beating Geoff's head repeatedly on the floor. Liz suggests a suicide pact whereupon Mike professes his love for her; this prompts her to climb the ladder to the shelter's entrance and unlock the door. When Mike discovers that she had the key all along he attempts to chase after her, rapidly climbing the ladder and causing it to break. Mike falls, is impaled by the broken ladder and dies.

After Liz finishes recounting the story, Phillipa asks her to make an official statement corroborating Martin's version of events. Liz refuses, having murdered Martin when he visited her the day before. Police arrive at the shelter and Liz begins screaming for help, pretending Phillipa is attempting to hurt her. Meanwhile, Martin's corpse is fished out of the river and in his pocket, police find the key to the shelter which implicates him in the events. The police attribute his death to suicide. Liz is allowed to go free. She leaves the shelter in the back of an ambulance, smirking at Phillipa from the window as it drives away.

Cast
 Thora Birch as Elizabeth "Liz" Dunn
 Desmond Harrington as Michael "Mike" Steel
 Daniel Brocklebank as Martin Taylor
 Laurence Fox as Geoffrey "Geoff" Bingham
 Keira Knightley as Frances "Frankie" Almond Smith
 Embeth Davidtz as Dr. Philippa Horwood
 Steven Waddington as DCS Tom Howard
 Gemma Craven as Mrs. Dunn
 Anastasia Hille as Forensic Pathologist Gillian
 Kelly Hunter as DI Chapman

Production
Nick Hamm began casting actors at the end of 1999. Hamm described newcomer Keira Knightley as a young version of Julie Christie. To prepare for the role, Thora Birch visited an English public school. Principal photography began on 2 July 2000 and ended on 9 November 2000 lasted six weeks and took place around London and southern England. Specific locations included Downside Boarding School in Somerset and Bray Studios. The film was shot in Super 35 format.

Reception
On Rotten Tomatoes, the film has an approval rating of 53% based on reviews from 17 critics.

Michael Thomson, in a review for the BBC, said the film was a "dark, grisly adventure" influenced by William Golding's novel Lord of the Flies, with the hole substituting for the island setting. He criticized the camerawork and some of the dialogue, but praised Thora Birch.

References

External links
 

2001 films
2001 thriller films
2001 psychological thriller films
2000s mystery thriller films
2000s psychological thriller films
2000s teen films
British mystery thriller films
British psychological thriller films
British teen films
Films about murderers
Films about pranks
Films based on British novels
Films based on young adult literature
Films directed by Nick Hamm
Films scored by Clint Mansell
Films shot at Bray Studios
Films shot in England
Teen mystery films
Teen thriller films
2000s English-language films
2000s British films
Films set in bunkers